Ottorino Volonterio (7 December 1917 – 10 March 2003) was a racing driver from Switzerland.

Biography
A member of Swiss nobility, he was born in Orselina and was trained as a lawyer, before he began participating in sports car racing.

He debuted in Formula One at the 1954 Spanish Grand Prix at Pedralbes in a Maserati 250F which he shared with Emmanuel de Graffenried, but the compatriots retired with engine failure. He contested two other World Championship Grands Prix, the 1956 German Grand Prix on the Nürburgring Nordschleife where he was unclassified having finished 6 laps behind race winner Juan Manuel Fangio, and the 1957 Italian Grand Prix at Monza with André Simon where he finished 11th some 15 laps behind the winner Stirling Moss.

Volonterio continued to compete in non-championship Formula One races and sports cars, with his best result a second place in the Coupe de Paris at Montlhéry in 1955. He also fielded Grand Prix cars for other drivers. He continued racing until 1973, and died in Lugano in 2003.

Complete World Championship Formula One Grand Prix results
(key) 

* Indicates shared drive with Toulo de Graffenried† Indicates shared drive with André Simon

References 

Swiss racing drivers
Swiss Formula One drivers
1917 births
2003 deaths
Sportspeople from Lugano
Swiss motorsport people
Swiss nobility
Formula One team owners
Swiss auto racing teams